The R754 road is a regional road in Ireland which links Avoca and the N11 in County Wicklow.

See also 
 Roads in Ireland
 National primary road

References 

Regional roads in the Republic of Ireland
Roads in County Wicklow